Delfin F. Colon  (born August 22, 1969) is a former Major League Baseball (MLB) umpire.

Colon served as an alternate umpire for the 2006 World Baseball Classic. He umpired his first MLB game on July 28, 2008, and his last on September 27, 2009. He officiated in a total of 46 games in his MLB career. In 2010, Colon became the first former MLB umpire to work in the Atlantic League.

See also 

 List of Major League Baseball umpires

References 

1969 births
Living people
Major League Baseball umpires
People from Santurce, Puerto Rico